Umma is an ancient city in Sumer.

Umma or UMMA may also refer to:
 Umma (1960 film), a Malayalam film
 Umma (2022 film), an American supernatural horror film starring Sandra Oh
 Ummah, an Arabic word meaning community or nation
 Umma (damselfly), a genus of damselflies
 University of Michigan Museum of Art
 Several political parties are called Umma Party

See also 
 Ooma